Reichel is a German surname. Notable people with the surname include:
Achim Reichel (born 1944), German musician and music producer, former member of The Rattles
Bernard Reichel (1901–1992), Swiss classical composer
Frantz Reichel (1871–1932), French athlete
Gerardo Reichel-Dolmatoff (1912–1994), Austrian-born anthropologist
Hans Reichel (born 1949), German guitarist and inventor
Kealiʻi Reichel (born 1962), Hawaiian musician and dancer
Manfred Reichel (1896—1984), Swiss micropaleontologist
Peter Reichel (born 1951), German professional football player
Robert Reichel (born 1971), Czech-born professional hockey player
Robinson Reichel (born 1966), German television actor
Verena Reichel (born 1945), German translator

See also
Reich
Reichl
Reichel/Pugh, a yacht design company
Pieris marginalis reicheli, a butterfly commonly known as Reichel's Margined White

Surnames from given names